The  is an award presented by the Recording Industry Association of Japan in the field of music.

Categories
Artist of the Year
New Artist of the Year
Best Enka/Kayokyoku Artist
Best Enka/Kayokyoku New Artist
Single of the Year
Song of the Year by Download
Song of the Year by Streaming
Album of the Year
Enka/Kayokyoku Album of the Year
Classic Album of the Year
Jazz Album of the Year
Instrumental Album of the Year
Soundtrack Album of the Year
Animation Album of the Year
Traditional Japanese Music Album of the Year
Concept Album of the Year
Music Video of the Year
Special Award
Best Asian Artist

List of the Artists of the Year

References

External links
Official website

Japanese music awards
Awards established in 1987
1987 establishments in Japan
Annual events in Japan
Recurring events established in 1987